"Playas Rock" is the third single by American rapper Hurricane Chris from his debut studio album, 51/50 Ratchet (2007). The hip hop song was produced by Mr. Collipark, and features Boxie.

Chart performance
The single peaked at number 25 on the Hot Rap Tracks and number 47 on the Hot R&B Songs charts.

Samples
The song contains a sample of "Love's Holiday", as performed by Earth, Wind and Fire.

Music video
Singer Nicole Wray makes a cameo appearance in the music video.

2007 songs
2008 singles
Hurricane Chris (rapper) songs
Song articles with missing songwriters